The 2019 Asian Development Tour was the ninth season of the Asian Development Tour, a second-tier tour operated by the Asian Tour.

Schedule
The following table lists official events during the 2019 season.

Order of Merit
The Order of Merit was based on prize money won during the season, calculated in U.S. dollars. The top seven players on the tour (not otherwise exempt) earned status to play on the 2020–21–22 Asian Tour.

Notes

References

Asian Development Tour
Asian Development Tour
Development Tour